The Women's scratch was held on 16 October 2015.

Results

References

Women's scratch
European Track Championships – Women's scratch